Nevada's 3rd congressional district is a congressional district occupying the area south of Las Vegas, including Henderson, Boulder City and much of unincorporated Clark County.  The district was initially created after the 2000 census.

It was intended to be a competitive  district, and as originally drawn had a relatively equal balance of registered Republicans and registered Democrats.  It is currently represented by Democrat Susie Lee.  It was one of only a handful of districts to vote for the national Presidential winner in 2004, 2008, 2012, 2016, and 2020 (in each case, by a very narrow margin).

Cities and communities 
 Las Vegas (part)
 Summerlin South
 Blue Diamond
 Spring Valley (part)
 Enterprise
 Paradise (part)
 Henderson
 Whitney (part)
 Boulder City
 Goodsprings
 Sandy Valley
 Searchlight
 Laughlin

Recent election results from statewide races
Results Under Current Lines (Since 2023)

Results Under Old Lines

List of members representing the district

Election results

2002

2004

2006

2008

2010

2012

2014

2016

2018

2020

2022

See also

Nevada's congressional districts
List of United States congressional districts

References
 Congressional Biographical Directory of the United States 1774–present

03
Congressional district, 03
Constituencies established in 2003
2003 establishments in Nevada